Bill Alexander (13 June 1910 – 11 July 2000), born as William Alexander, was a leading activist within the Communist Party of Great Britain (CPGB), most known for commanding the British Battalion of the International Brigades during the Spanish Civil War. During World War II he underwent a commissioning course at Sandhurst military academy, graduating top of his year. He then served in Germany, Italy and Northern Africa, during which he was promoted to the rank of captain in the Reconnaissance Corps. Later in life he became an author, the vice-chairman of the International Brigade Association, and the president of London's Marx Memorial Library. Alexander spent the remainder of his life promoting Marxism–Leninism, and was a member of the CPGB until the party was dissolved in 1991.

Early life 
Alexander was the son of a carpenter, born into a large working-class family in the rural English town of Ringwood, Hampshire. Influenced by both his mother's political beliefs and the British National Hunger March of 1932,  Alexander joined the CPGB in 1932, studied chemistry at the University of Reading and became an industrial chemist, although much of his time was spent promoting communism through the CPGB and working with trade unions. He was a prominent anti-fascist activist and was present at the Battle of Cable Street.

Spanish Civil War
In spring of 1937, Alexander volunteered to join the British Battalion of the International Brigades to aid the Republican side in the Spanish Civil War. Arriving in Spain, Alexander first saw combat during the Battle of Brunete. After a fortnight of fighting, his battalion went from a strength of 300 to 42, with Alexander one of the survivors. He joined the 15th Brigade's Anti-Tank Battery, an elite unit armed with high-calibre Soviet anti-tank weaponry, and soon became the unit's political commissar, He received a citation for bravery at the Battle of Belchite in September 1937. Alexander eventually rose to the rank of commander of the British Battalion and led his troops into combat during the Battle of Teruel. During this battle, he sustained serious bullet wounds to his chest and shoulder. Due to his injuries, he returned to the UK in June 1938.

World War II
Once Alexander had returned to Britain from Spain, he was made the CPGB's Merseyside Area secretary. He attempted to join the Royal Military Academy Sandhurst early in World War II, initially being refused a place on account of his CPGB membership. However, his case was taken up by the Duchess of Atholl and he was eventually permitted to attend. In 1940 he accepted his commissioning course at Sandhurst, from which graduated as the top cadet of his year. During World War II, Alexander served the Allied forces in Africa and Europe. Despite communists such as himself suffering persistent discrimination within the British military, he rose to the rank of captain within the Reconnaissance Corps. After leaving the British Army, Alexander returned to working as a full-time activist for the CPGB.

Post-WWII and later life
Alexander stood in Coventry East at the 1945 and 1951 general elections, but lost his deposit on both occasions. He was Midlands Area Secretary of the CPGB from 1947 to 1953, then Welsh Area Secretary until 1959, when he was made Assistant General Secretary of the party. In 1967, Alexander stood down from his CPGB post, and instead became a chemistry teacher at Sydenham School, and taught chemistry in south-east London until his retirement.  He was later involved with the Marx Memorial Library, holding its presidency from 1989 until 1996.  He ran the International Brigade Association, and wrote extensively on the Spanish Civil War, publishing British Volunteers For Liberty, No To Franco and contributing to Memorials Of The Spanish Civil War.

Alexander remained a member of the CPGB until the party's dissolution and was a prominent opponent of what he regarded as revisionism during the 1980s. During the 1990s, he spoke in favour of environmental causes.

Works 
British Volunteers For Liberty. Lawrence and Wishart, UK, 1982
No To Franco: The Struggle Never Stopped 1939-1975. B. Alexander, 1992
Memorials Of The Spanish Civil War. Sutton, UK, 1996

See also 

 Thora Silverthorne
 GCT Giles
 Charlie Hutchison
 Ralph Winston Fox

References

1910 births
2000 deaths
Alumni of the University of Reading
British people of the Spanish Civil War
Communist Party of Great Britain members
People from Ringwood, Hampshire
British Army personnel of World War II
International Brigades personnel
Reconnaissance Corps officers
Graduates of the Royal Military College, Sandhurst
Military personnel from Hampshire